Tennis is a U.S. print sports magazine devoted to the sport of tennis. It is published eight months per year, and operates a website, Tennis.com.

History
The magazine was established in May 1965, published out of Chicago with a regional focus.  Asher Birnbaum of Skokie, IL was the founder, editor and publisher. The tennis boom of the 1970s resulted in a rapid expansion of the magazine, both in scope and circulation. In addition to top tennis stars, celebrities like Johnny Carson and Farrah Fawcett appeared on the cover. It was owned by Golf Digest / Tennis Magazine and sold to the New York Times Company.

Miller Publishing bought the magazine in 1997 from The New York Times Company. It brought on two retired champions as part owners and contributors: first Chris Evert in 2000 then Pete Sampras in 2003. In the early 2010s the circulation was 600,000 subscriptions, the majority of which were purchased by the United States Tennis Association (USTA) for its members.

In 2014, publisher and USTA board member Jeff Willams purchased controlling interest in Tennis Media Company, owner of the magazine and its offshoot website. In 2017, Sinclair Broadcast Group, owner of Tennis Channel, acquired Tennis Media Company for $8 million, seeking to build synergies between the properties.

Content
Aside from articles about the most recent events and most active players, the magazine also includes the recent ranking for both ATP and WTA, as well as brief summaries of the future tournaments, their participants and the past winners.

Chris Evert has her own personal section in the magazine—usually the first page—which is called "Chrissie's Page". Aside from Evert, other famous players and coaches also contribute to the magazine, Pete Sampras, Paul Annacone, former coach of Sampras, is the Senior Instruction Editor and Brad Gilbert, former coach of Andre Agassi and Andy Roddick, is Touring Instruction Editor.

"The 40 Greatest Players of the Tennis Era" (2005) 

In celebration of its 40th anniversary (1965–2005), Tennis published a series rating the 40 best players of those four decades.

  Pete Sampras
  Martina Navratilova
  Steffi Graf
  Chris Evert
  Björn Borg
  Margaret Court
  Jimmy Connors
  Rod Laver
  Billie Jean King
  Ivan Lendl
  John McEnroe
  Andre Agassi
  Monica Seles
  Stefan Edberg
  Mats Wilander
  John Newcombe
  Serena Williams
  Boris Becker
  Roger Federer
  Ken Rosewall
  Roy Emerson
  Martina Hingis
  Evonne Goolagong
  Guillermo Vilas
  Venus Williams
  Jim Courier
  Arantxa Sánchez Vicario
  Ilie Năstase
  Lindsay Davenport
  Arthur Ashe
  Justine Henin
  Tracy Austin
  Hana Mandlíková
  Lleyton Hewitt
  Stan Smith
  Jennifer Capriati
  Gustavo Kuerten
  Virginia Wade
  Patrick Rafter
  Gabriela Sabatini

"The 50 Greatest Players of the Open Era" (2018)

In celebration of the 50th anniversary of the Open Era in tennis (1968–2018), the magazine published a series rating the 50 best players of those five decades (25 men and 25 women).
Active players are marked in boldface.

Men
1.  Roger Federer
2.  Rod Laver
3.  Rafael Nadal
4.  Pete Sampras
5.  Novak Djokovic
6.  Björn Borg
7.  Ken Rosewall
8.  Ivan Lendl
9.  John McEnroe
10.  Jimmy Connors
11.  Andre Agassi
12.  Mats Wilander
13.  Boris Becker
14.  Stefan Edberg
15.  John Newcombe
16.  Guillermo Vilas
17.  Jim Courier
18.  Andy Murray
19.  Ilie Năstase
20.  Arthur Ashe
21.  Gustavo Kuerten
22.  Lleyton Hewitt
23.  Stan Smith
24.  Stan Wawrinka
25.  Andy Roddick

Women
1.  Serena Williams
2.  Steffi Graf
3.  Martina Navratilova
4.  Margaret Court
5.  Chris Evert
6.  Billie Jean King
7.  Monica Seles
8.  Venus Williams
9.  Justine Henin
10.  Evonne Goolagong
11.  Martina Hingis
12.  Maria Sharapova
13.  Arantxa Sánchez Vicario
14.  Kim Clijsters
15.  Lindsay Davenport
16.  Virginia Wade
17.  Jennifer Capriati
18.  Tracy Austin
19.  Hana Mandlíková
20.  Gabriela Sabatini
21.  Amélie Mauresmo
22.  Victoria Azarenka
23.  Angelique Kerber
24.  Caroline Wozniacki
25.  Na Li

See also

 Inside Tennis
 Tennis Week

References

External links
 

Tennis
Eight times annually magazines published in the United States
Tennis
Magazines established in 1965
Magazines published in New York City
Tennis magazines
2017 mergers and acquisitions
Sinclair Broadcast Group